Major General William Selwyn (1655 – 6 April 1702) was an officer in the British Army, MP and briefly Governor of Jamaica.

Early life
He was the 5th and eldest surviving son of William Selwyn of Matson, Gloucestershire and Margaret, the daughter of Edward Nourse of Gloucester and was educated at Oriel College, Oxford, matriculating on 11 April 1674.

Military career
Selwyn served in the Army of the United Provinces of the Netherlands, in the time of King Charles II. He served at the head of his regiment at the Battle of Landen on 29 July 1693, distinguishing himself under the eye of the King William III. He then took part at the siege of Namur in the summer of 1695 and was promoted to the rank of brigadier general during the siege.

He became Mayor of Gloucester in 1675. He inherited Matson House in Matson, Gloucester, in 1679 on the death of his father.

He was elected MP for Gloucester in 1698, sitting until 1701. Although he was naturally a Whig, being from the Gloucester countryside, Selwyn was on duty at the execution of William, Lord Russell, the leader of the Country Party.

Selwyn was appointed Governor of Jamaica in January, 1702, but died there three months later, in the year of his 47th birthday. His body was transported back to England to be buried at Matson. He had married Albinia, daughter of Richard Betensen and Albinia, daughter of Christopher Wray on 26 May 1681 at Westminster Abbey with whom he had 4 sons and 3 daughters. Their eldest son John and a younger son Charles both became MPs.

References

1655 births
1702 deaths
English generals
Cheshire Regiment officers
Queen's Royal Regiment officers
Alumni of Oriel College, Oxford
Mayors of Gloucester
Members of the Parliament of England (pre-1707) for Gloucester
English MPs 1698–1700
English MPs 1701–1702
Governors of Jamaica
Date of birth unknown